Cheshmeh Shirin (also Romanized as Cheshmeh Shīrīn, Chashmeh Shīrīn, and Cheshmeh-ye Shīrīn) is a village in Qatruyeh Rural District, Qatruyeh District, Neyriz County, Fars Province, Iran. At the 2006 census, its population was 70, in 18 families.

References 

Populated places in Neyriz County